Paymaster Rear-Admiral Sir Bertram Cowles Allen  (29 November 1875 – 7 February 1957) was a British Royal Navy officer.

Allen was the son of Royal Navy officer George Henry Allen and his wife, Fanny Allen. He was educated at Christ's Hospital and commissioned in the Royal Navy in 1893. He fought in the Naval Brigade during the Second Boer War, and was awarded clasps for Belmont, Modder River, Driefontein and Paardeburg. He was promoted to paymaster in 1900, and served as paymaster on RMS Medina during George V's voyage to the Delhi Durbar in 1911. He was made a Member of the Royal Victorian Order in 1912 in recognition of his services during the voyage. He saw active service in the First World War and was invested as a Companion of the Order of the Bath in 1919.

Allen was promoted to Paymaster Captain in 1921 and served as Secretary to the Fourth Sea Lord, before working as Paymaster Director-General between 1926 and his retirement in 1929. That year he was knighted in the 1929 Birthday Honours as a Knight Commander of the Order of the Bath.

In 1908, he married Edith Mary Perks, the daughter of Sir Robert Perks, 1st Baronet. Together they had two daughters.

References

1875 births
1957 deaths
Knights Commander of the Order of the Bath
Members of the Royal Victorian Order
People educated at Christ's Hospital
Royal Navy officers
Royal Navy personnel of the Second Boer War
Royal Navy logistics officers